Mehdi Rahimzadeh (born March 1, 1989) is an Iranian footballer.

Club career
Rahimzadeh started his career with Malavan F.C.

Club career statistics

References

1989 births
Living people
Malavan players
Gostaresh Foulad F.C. players
Damash Gilan players
Iranian footballers
Association football goalkeepers